Pacrinolol is a beta adrenergic receptor antagonist.

References

Beta blockers
Nitriles
Phenoxypropanolamines
Alkene derivatives
Catechol ethers
Methoxy compounds